Colpocraspeda is a monotypic moth genus in the family Geometridae. It has a single species, Colpocraspeda elegans, found in Papua New Guinea. Both the genus and species were first described by Warren in 1907

References

External links 

Ennominae
Geometridae genera
Monotypic moth genera
Moths of Oceania